Willem-Frederik Schiltz (born June 22, 1979) is a Belgian politician for the Open VLD.

Biography
Schiltz is the son of politician Hugo Schiltz. He studied law at universities in Belgium and London before working for a law firm.

Since 2014, he has served as a member of the Flemish Parliament for the Open VLD and between 2019 and 2021 was designated as a Senator for the Open VLD faction. In 2019, he became the floor leader and spokesman for the Open VLD in the Flemish Parliament.

Notes

1979 births
Living people
Members of the Flemish Parliament
Members of the Senate (Belgium)
21st-century Belgian politicians
Open Vlaamse Liberalen en Democraten politicians
People from Wilrijk